Paul Friedman (born 1968, Evanston, Illinois) is the  public address announcer at Wrigley Field for the Chicago Cubs.   Friedman returned as the public address announcer at Wrigley Field starting on opening day 2021. Previously Friedman served as the Cubs public address announcer from 1995-2010.

References

1968 births
Living people
People from Evanston, Illinois
Public address announcers